List of Ministers for Public health of Uruguay since 1933:

External links 
  Uruguayan Ministry for Public health (in Spanish only)

 
Health